Hsu Hai-ching (許海清; 1913 – April 6, 2005) was a veteran gangster in Taiwan.

References

External links 
Asia Times report on his funeral

1913 births
2005 deaths
Kuomintang politicians in Taiwan
Politicians of the Republic of China on Taiwan from Taipei
Taiwanese gangsters